Sex and the Other Woman (also known as The Other Woman) is a 1972 British romantic sex comedy film directed by Stanley A. Long. The film starring Bartlett Mullins, Peggy Ann Clifford, Maggie Wright, Anthony Bailey and Margaret Burton in the lead roles.

Cast
 Bartlett Mullins as Henry
 Peggy Ann Clifford as Henry's Wife
 Maggie Wright as Elizabeth
 Anthony Bailey as Reggie
 Margaret Burton as Flora
 Kay Adrian as Flora's Friend
 Jeremy Nicholas as Arthur
 Barbara Wendy as Sally
 Gordon Gale as Arnold
 Jane Cardew as Lisa
 Peter Dunn aa Chris
 Louise Pajo as Shirley
 Gillian Brown as Sue
 Anthony Howard as managing director
 Stacey Davies as Kershaw
 Olive Mercer as cleaner
 Felicity Devonshire as Sarah
 Raymond Young as Guy Parkinson
 Louise Rush as Louise
 Mary Barclay as Cynthia
 Barbara Meale as Barbara
 Max Mason as Ted
 Stella Tanner as mother-in-law
 Richard Wattis as presenter

References

External links
 

1972 films
1972 romantic comedy films
British romantic comedy films
1970s English-language films
Films directed by Stanley Long
1970s British films